Bellyfruit (also spelled Belly Fruit) is a 1999 American independent drama film about teen pregnancy directed and co-written by Kerri Green. The film is the first feature film released by The Asylum.

Overview
Bellyfruit is an adaptation of an original stage play of the same title which premiered at the Los Angeles Theatre Center on March 16, 1996. The play is a culmination of written works and theatrical performances developed from the stories of the women from Ramona High School and the Pacoima Young Mothers writing program. Playing the roles of the teen mothers in the original stage production of Bellyfruit were actresses Bonnie Dickensen, Tanya Wright, Jude Herrera, and Patrice Pitman Quinn. The stage play was produced by Independent Women Artists and performed as a benefit for Gramercy Group Homes in Los Angeles. It was also directed by Kerri Green, and was written by Green, Maria Bernhard, Susannah Blinkoff, and Janet Borrus.

Cast
 Kelly Vint Castro as Christina
 Tonatzin Mondragon as Aracely
 T.E. Russell as Damon
 Michael Peña as Oscar
 James DuMont as Lou
 Melody Garrett as Doctor
 Ruben Madera as Eddie
 Luis Chávez as Enrique
 Jeremy John Wells as Joe

Reception

Variety found that the film is "a sympathetic portrait of the girls that, thankfully, remains free of sentiment. But surprisingly, it’s Pena’s understated performance that resonates the most. “Bellyfruit,” mounted first as a play, has a gritty look and feel that serve its material well."

References

External links
 
 
  (rating 2.5/5)

1999 drama films
1999 independent films
1999 films
The Asylum films
American drama films
1999 directorial debut films
1990s English-language films
American independent films
Films set in Los Angeles
American films based on plays
Teenage pregnancy in film
1990s American films